The Battle of Mons Lactarius (also known as Battle of the Vesuvius) took place in 552 or 553 AD during the Gothic War waged on behalf of Justinian I against the Ostrogoths in Italy.

After the Battle of Taginae, in which the Ostrogoth king Totila was killed, the Byzantine general Narses captured Rome and besieged Cumae. Teia, the new Ostrogothic king, gathered the remnants of the Ostrogothic army and marched to relieve the siege, but in October 552 (or early 553) Narses ambushed him at Mons Lactarius (modern Monti Lattari) in Campania, near Mount Vesuvius and Nuceria Alfaterna. The battle lasted two days, and Teia was killed in the fighting. Ostrogothic power in Italy was eliminated, and many of the remaining Ostrogoths went north and (re)settled in south Austria. After the battle, Italy was again invaded, this time by the Franks, but they too were defeated and the peninsula was, for a brief period of time, reintegrated into the Empire. This brief period of Roman rule was brought to an end by the invasion of the Lombards, a Germanic tribe, in 568.

Sources
 History of the Later Roman Empire by J. B. Bury, from Lacus Curtius

550s conflicts
Battles involving the Byzantine Empire
Battles involving the Ostrogoths
Battles in Campania
Gothic War (535–554)
550s in the Byzantine Empire
552